Life's Whirlpool (also known as McTeague) is a 1916 American silent film drama directed by Barry O'Neil. The first motion picture adaptation of Frank Norris's 1899 novel McTeague, the film stars Holbrook Blinn and Fania Marinoff as McTeague and Trina. These roles later were played by Gibson Gowland and Zasu Pitts in Eric von Stroheim's 1924 adaptation Greed. Blinn was famous for playing brutal characters on the stage, as in the Edward Sheldon play Salvation Nell (1908).

The film is considered a lost film.

Cast
Holbrook Blinn as McTeague
Fania Marinoff as Trina
Walter Green as Marcus Schuller
Philip Robson as Mr. Sieppe
Julia Stuart as Mrs. Sieppe
Rosemary Dean as Selina Sieppe
Eleanor Blanchard as Maria Cappa

See also
List of lost films

References
Notes

External links

Life's Whirlpool at silentera.com

1916 films
1916 drama films
Silent American drama films
American silent feature films
Films based on American novels
Films based on works by Frank Norris
Lost American films
American black-and-white films
World Film Company films
1916 lost films
Lost drama films
Uxoricide in fiction
Films directed by Barry O'Neil
1910s American films